The 2020–21 season was the 122nd season in the existence of Futbol Club Barcelona and its 91st consecutive season in the top flight of Spanish football. In addition to the domestic league, Barcelona participated in this season's editions of the Copa del Rey, the Supercopa de España, and the UEFA Champions League. The season covered the period from 15 August 2020 to 30 June 2021, with the late start to the season due to the COVID-19 pandemic. The season was the first since 2013–14 without Luis Suárez, who departed to Atlético Madrid.

Coming off a disastrous 2019–20 season, which not only ended trophyless for the first time in 12 years, but also produced a humiliating 2–8 defeat to Bayern München in the Champions League, Barcelona looked to bounce back. Ronald Koeman was brought in place of Quique Setién and he immediately emphasized his strive to reform the squad, underscored by the departure of Luis Suárez to Atlético Madrid. The season ended up being a stable one, as Barça clinched a record-extending 31st Copa del Rey and fought till the end for La Liga title, although several stumbles on the finish line meant they finished third, the club's lowest position since 2007–08. In the Champions League, Barcelona finished second in its group and then lost to PSG in the round of 16, breaking its streak of consecutive quarter-finals appearances, which had lasted from 2007–08. Although not known at the time, this season ended up being Lionel Messi's last at Barcelona. He scored his last goal in his last game, which Barça lost 1–2 to Celta Vigo on 16 May 2021.

Kits

Barcelona utilized five sets of kits (excluding variations) throughout the season, a club record. This included a fourth Senyera stripe from the previous season and a 'special' Clásico kit which ended up being used against Real Madrid, Atlético Madrid and the Copa del Rey final against Athletic Bilbao.

Season overview

August
On 17 August, Quique Setién was dismissed as the first team head coach after only seven months in charge.

On 19 August, the club announced that Ronald Koeman would be the new head coach until 30 June 2022.

September
On 1 September, Barcelona reached an agreement with Sevilla FC for the transfer of Ivan Rakitić for €1.5 million plus €9 million in variables.

On 21 September, Barcelona reached an agreement with PAOK FC for the transfer of Moussa Wagué on loan for the rest of the season without a buy option.

On 22 September, Barcelona reached an agreement with Inter Milan for the free transfer of Arturo Vidal with €1 million in variables.

On 23 September, Barcelona announced the transfer of Nélson Semedo to Wolverhampton Wanderers F.C. for a fee of €30 million plus €10 million in variables. On the same day, Barça announced that the club had reached an agreement with Atlético Madrid for the departure of Luis Suárez on a free transfer with €6 million in variables.

On 27 September, Barcelona won their La Liga opener in a 4–0 home win against Villarreal CF. A brace from Ansu Fati, a penalty from Lionel Messi, and an own goal from Pau Torres gave Barça the victory.

October
On 1 October, Barcelona announced the signing of Sergiño Dest from AFC Ajax for a fee of €21 million plus €5 million in variables. Later that same day, Barça defeated Celta de Vigo 3–0 away from home. Another goal from Ansu Fati, a Lucas Olaza own goal, and a late goal from Sergi Roberto sealed the victory for the Blaugrana, ending a five-year winless streak at the Balaídos.

On 4 October, Barcelona drew 1–1 with Sevilla at home. Luuk de Jong got the visitors off the mark but Philippe Coutinho equalized for the home side shortly after.

On 5 October, Barcelona reached an agreement with S.L. Benfica for the loan of Jean-Clair Todibo with an option to buy for €20 million. The club also announced the departure of Rafinha to Paris Saint-Germain on a free transfer.

On 17 October, Barcelona lost 1–0 to Getafe CF away from home. Jaime Mata scored from the penalty spot to inflict Barça's first defeat of the season.

On 20 October, Barcelona beat Ferencváros 5–1 in their first Champions League game of the season. Goals from Lionel Messi, Ansu Fati, Philippe Coutinho, Pedri, and Ousmane Dembélé ensured victory for the Blaugrana. Later that day, Barça announced the contract extensions of Gerard Piqué until 2024, Marc-André ter Stegen until 2025, Frenkie de Jong and Clément Lenglet until 2026.

On 24 October, Barcelona lost 3–1 at home to rivals Real Madrid in El Clásico. Federico Valverde got the visitors off the mark early into the match but Ansu Fati equalized shortly after, in the process becoming the second youngest goalscorer in El Clásico history and scoring Barça's 400th goal in the fixture's history. Sergio Ramos scored from the penalty spot after a controversial penalty decision and Luka Modrić sealed the game off for Los Blancos.

On 27 October, President Josep Maria Bartomeu announced his resignation and the resignation of his board of directors, after six years of being the head of the club.

On 28 October, Barcelona announced that Carles Tusquets would be the interim club president until elections were held. Later that same day, Barça defeated Juventus 2–0 away from home in the Champions League. Goals from Dembélé and Messi gave Barça the victory.

On 31 October, Barcelona drew 1–1 with Deportivo Alavés. Luis Rioja would take advantage of a mix-up between Gerard Piqué and Neto to put the home side 1–0 up. Antoine Griezmann would equalize in the second-half and score his first goal of the season.

November
On 4 November, Barcelona defeated Dynamo Kyiv 2–1 at home in the Champions League. An early goal from Messi and a header from Piqué ensured victory for Barça.

On 7 November, Barcelona defeated Real Betis 5–2 at home. Goals from Dembélé, Griezmann, Pedri and a brace from Messi gave Barça the win.

On 21 November, Barcelona lost 1–0 to Atlético Madrid away from home. Yannick Carrasco scored the only goal after taking advantage of a mistake from Marc-André ter Stegen.

On 24 November, Barcelona defeated Dynamo Kyiv 4–0 away from home in the Champions League. Sergiño Dest scored his first goal for Barcelona, Martin Braithwaite scored a brace, and Griezmann came off the bench to finish the game off.

On 30 November, Barcelona defeated Osasuna 4–0 at home. Braithwaite, Griezmann, Coutinho and Messi were the goalscorers.

December
On 2 December, Barcelona defeated Ferencváros 3–0 away from home in the Champions League. First half goals from Griezmann, Braithwaite and Dembélé were enough to secure a comfortable victory.

On 5 December, Barcelona lost to Cádiz CF 2–1 away from home in the league. Álvaro Giménez scored first for the home side but Barça drew level with an own goal from Pedro Alcalá. The Andalusians went back in front after Álvaro Negredo came off the bench to score the winner.

On 8 December, Barcelona lost to Juventus 3–0 at home in the Champions League after conceding two penalties converted by Cristiano Ronaldo and a goal from Weston McKennie. As a result, Barcelona finished 2nd in Champions League Group G.

On 13 December, Barcelona defeated Levante 1–0 at home. Messi scored the only goal in the game.

On 16 December, Barcelona defeated Real Sociedad 2–1 at home.
Jordi Alba and Frenkie de Jong scored for Barça after trailing by one goal.

On 19 December, Barcelona drew 2–2 with Valencia at home. Lionel Messi and Ronald Araújo were the goalscorers for Barça.

On 22 December, Barcelona defeated Real Valladolid 3–0 away from home. Lenglet, Braithwaite and Messi were the goalscorers. Messi surpassed Pelé as the highest goalscorer for a single club with his goal against Valladolid.

On 29 December, Barcelona drew 1–1 with Eibar at home. Kike got the visitors off the mark after taking advantage of an error by Araújo. Dembélé came off the bench to score the equalizer.

January
On 3 January, Barcelona defeated Huesca 1–0 away from home. De Jong scored the only goal in the game.

On 6 January, Barcelona and Getafe reached an agreement for the loan of Carles Aleñá for the remainder of the season. Later that same day, Barcelona defeated Athletic Bilbao 3–2 away from home. Iñaki Williams gave an early lead for the home side but Pedri equalized with a header. Messi sealed victory for Barça by scoring two goals.

On 9 January, Barcelona defeated Granada 4–0 away from home. Braces from Griezmann and Messi earned a comfortable victory for Barça.

On 13 January, Barcelona defeated Real Sociedad in a penalty shoot-out 2–3 in the Supercopa de España after the score ended 1–1 during regulation time and extra time. Frenkie de Jong put Barça in the lead after converting a header, but Mikel Oyarzabal equalized for La Real in the second half. Ter Stegen would go on to save two penalties in the shoot-out and Riqui Puig stepped up and scored the decisive penalty to send the Catalans to the final.

On 17 January, Barcelona lost 3–2 to Athletic Bilbao in the Supercopa de España final. Antoine Griezmann struck first and put Barça in the lead but Óscar de Marcos quickly equalized. Griezmann would later score again, but Asier Villalibre scored in the final minute to make the score 2–2 and send the match into extra time. Iñaki Williams scored at the start of extra time and Los Leones won the Super Cup. The game also featured Lionel Messi's first red card while playing for FC Barcelona.

On 21 January, Barcelona defeated Cornellà 2–0 away from home in the Copa del Rey. Dembélé and Braithwaite scored the goals in extra time.

On 24 January, Barcelona defeated Elche 2–0 at the Estadio Manuel Martínez Valero. Frenkie de Jong and Riqui Puig scored for the Blaugrana. The latter also scored his first goal for the first team.

On 27 January, Barcelona defeated Rayo Vallecano 2–1 away from home in Copa del Rey round of 16. Rayo took the lead in the 63rd minute, but Barça came-back with goals from Messi and De Jong.

On 31 January, Barça defeated Athletic Bilbao 2–1 at home in La Liga. Messi scored his 650th for the club and Griezmann scored to claim all three points.

February
On 1 February, Barcelona announced that the club had reached an agreement with Benfica to terminate the loan of Jean-Clair Todibo. Todibo subsequently joined OGC Nice on loan until the remainder of the season, with an option to buy for €8.5 million.

On 3 February, Barcelona defeated Granada 5–3 away from home in the Copa del Rey quarter-finals. The home side took a 2–0 lead through goals from Kenedy and Roberto Soldado, but Barça came back in the last minutes of the game with goals from Antoine Griezmann and Jordi Alba, forcing extra time. Barça took the lead in the 100th minute of extra time with a header from Griezmann, but Granada soon equalized with a penalty converted by Fede Vico. However, Barça again took the lead with a goal from De Jong, and the game was sealed with a rasping volley from Jordi Alba, assuring passage to the semi-finals.

On 7 February, Barcelona defeated Real Betis 3–2 away from home. The hosts took the lead through Borja Iglesias but a goal from Messi and an own goal from Víctor Ruiz handed Barcelona the lead, until the latter made amends for his own goal by equalizing the game. Francisco Trincão came off the bench to score his first goal for Barça and secure the win.

On 10 February, Barcelona lost to Sevilla 2–0 in the first leg of Copa del Rey semi-finals. Jules Koundé and former Barça player Ivan Rakitić scored the goals for Sevilla.

On 13 February, Barcelona defeated Deportivo Alavés 5–1 at home. Braces from Trincão and Messi and a goal from Junior Firpo led the Blaugrana to victory.

On 16 February, Barcelona lost to Paris Saint-Germain 4–1 at home in the first leg of the Champions League round of 16.
Messi scored from the penalty spot to put Barça in the lead but a hat-trick from Kylian Mbappé and a goal from Moise Kean gave the visitors the victory.

On 21 February, Barcelona drew 1–1 with Cádiz at home. Messi scored from the penalty spot to give the lead for Barça but Cádiz drew late with a penalty converted by Álex Fernández.

On 24 February, Barcelona defeated Elche 3–0 at home. A brace from Messi and a goal from Jordi Alba were enough to take all three points.

On 27 February, Barcelona defeated Sevilla 2–0 away from home. Dembélé and Messi were the goalscorers.

March
On 3 March, Barcelona defeated Sevilla 3–0 (3–2 agg.) in the second leg of Copa del Rey semi-finals. An early goal from Dembélé and a goal from Piqué in the last minute of the game leveled the aggregate score and forced the match into extra time. Martin Braithwaite scored the winning goal in 95th minute to secure a spot in the final.

On 6 March, Barcelona defeated Osasuna 2–0 away from home. Jordi Alba and Ilaix Moriba scored for the Blaugrana, with the latter scoring his first senior goal.

On 7 March, Joan Laporta was elected as the new club president, having previously served as club president from 2003 until 2010.

On 10 March, Barcelona drew 1–1 with Paris Saint-Germain in the second leg of the Champions League round of 16. Kylian Mbappé scored from the penalty spot to put Paris in the lead but Messi equalized for Barça shortly after. With an aggregate score of 5–2, Barcelona were eliminated from the Champions League.

On 15 March, Barcelona defeated Huesca 4–1 at home. A brace from Messi and goals from Griezmann and Óscar Mingueza – with his first senior goal – led the Blaugrana to victory.

On 21 March, Barcelona defeated Real Sociedad 6–1 away from home. Dest and Messi scored braces while Griezmann and Dembélé scored a goal each.

April
On 5 April, Barcelona defeated Real Valladolid 1–0 at home. Dembélé scored the winning goal in the 90th minute. After this victory Barcelona stood one point away from Atlético, one week before El Clásico. This meant Barcelona had reduced the distance with La Liga's leaders by 11 points since last defeat against Cádiz on December 5th, winning 51 of 57 possible points.

On 10 April, Barcelona lost 2–1 to fierce rivals Real Madrid away from home. First half goals came from Karim Benzema and Toni Kroos, and while Óscar Mingueza pulled one back for the Catalans, however it wasn't enough as the visitors lost the first Clásico at the Alfredo Di Stéfano Stadium.

On 17 April, Barcelona won their 31st Copa del Rey after defeating Athletic Bilbao 4–0 in the final. De Jong and Griezmann scored a goal each while Messi scored a brace.

On 22 April, Barcelona released a statement confirming that the Catalan club would be forming a part of a breakaway European Super League, a proposed annual club football competition to be contested by twenty of Europe's most elite football clubs. Later that day, Barça defeated Getafe 5–2 at home. A brace from Messi, a header from Araújo, a penalty converted by Griezmann and an own goal secured victory for the home side.

On 25 April, Barcelona defeated Villarreal 2–1 away from home. A brace from Griezmann in the first half helped turn the tie around for the visitors after being a goal behind.

On 29 April, Barcelona lost 2–1 to Granada at home. Messi gave Barcelona the lead in the first half, but the Blaugrana ended up being the losing side after conceding two goals in the second half from Darwin Machís and Jorge Molina.

May
On 2 May, Barcelona defeated Valencia 3–2 away from home. A brace from Messi and a goal scored by Griezmann secured  victory for the visitors after being a goal behind.

On 8 May, Barcelona drew 0–0 against Atlético Madrid at home.

On 11 May, Barcelona drew 3–3 against Levante away from home. Goals from Messi and Pedri gave Barça a two-goal lead in the first half, but Levante equalized after scoring two goals in two minutes. Barcelona restored the lead with a goal from Dembélé, but the lead was cancelled out again after the home side scored a goal.

On 16 May, Barcelona lost 2–1 to Celta Vigo at home. Messi gave Barcelona the lead, but a brace from Santi Mina won the game for Celta.

On 22 May, Barcelona defeated Eibar 1–0 away from home, with Griezmann scoring the only goal of the game. Barcelona ended the season with a 3rd place finish in La Liga, its lowest since 2007–08.

Players

From Barcelona B and Youth Academy

Transfers

In

Out

Loans out

Transfer summary
Undisclosed fees are not included in the transfer totals.

Expenditure

Summer:  €124,000,000

Winter:  €0,000,000

Total:  €124,000,000

Income

Summer:  €137,000,000

Winter:  €0,000,000

Total:  €137,000,000

Net totals

Summer:  €13,000,000

Winter:  €000,000

Total:  €13,000,000

Pre-season and friendlies

Competitions

Overall record

La Liga

League table

Results summary

Results by round

Matches
The league fixtures were announced on 31 August 2020.

Copa del Rey

Supercopa de España

The draw was held on 17 December 2020.

UEFA Champions League

Group stage

The group stage draw was held on 1 October 2020.

Knockout phase

Round of 16
The draw for the round of 16 was held on 14 December 2020.

Statistics

Squad appearances and goals

|-
! colspan="14" style="background:#dcdcdc; text-align:center"|Goalkeepers

|-
! colspan="14" style="background:#dcdcdc; text-align:center"|Defenders

|-
! colspan="14" style="background:#dcdcdc; text-align:center"|Midfielders

|-
! colspan="14" style="background:#dcdcdc; text-align:center"|Forwards

|-
! colspan=14 style=background:#dcdcdc; text-align:center|Players who made an appearance this season but left the club

|}

Goalscorers

Disciplinary record

Injury record

Notes

References

External links

FC Barcelona seasons
Barcelona
Barcelona
2020–21 in Catalan football